Raman Tool Set is a free software package for processing and analysis of Raman spectroscopy datasets. It has been developed mainly aiming to Raman spectra analysis, but since it works with 2-columns datafiles (Intensity vs Frequency) it can deal with the results of many spectroscopy techniques.

Beyond the spectra preprocessing steps, such as baseline subtraction, normalization of spectra, smoothing and scaling, Raman Tool Set allows the user for chemometric analysis by means of principal component analysis (PCA), extended multiplicative signal correction  (EMSC) and cluster analysis. Chemometric and multivariate data analysis can also be applied to hyperspectral maps, using PCA, independent component analysis (ICA) and cluster analysis.

Raman Tool Set is currently developed  at BioNEM Lab of the University "Magna Graecia" of Catanzaro, Italy.

References

External links 
 Raman Tool Set download site
 BioNEM Lab website

Science software
Raman spectroscopy